Etna Island is an island with a high summit, lying  north of the eastern end of Joinville Island, off the northeastern tip of the Antarctic Peninsula. It was discovered by a British expedition under James Clark Ross, 1839–43, who so named it because of its resemblance to the volcanic Mount Etna in Sicily.

See also 
 List of Antarctic and sub-Antarctic islands

References 

Islands of the Joinville Island group